Thomas Knox, 3rd Earl of Ranfurly (13 November 1816 – 20 May 1858), styled Viscount Northland between 1840 and 1858, was an Irish peer and member of parliament. He was the son of Thomas Knox, 2nd Earl of Ranfurly and his wife Mary Juliana Stuart, and represented Dungannon as a member of parliament between 9 June 1838 and 3 February 1851, when he resigned through the position of Steward of the Chiltern Hundreds due to ill health. He was educated at St John's College, Cambridge.

Family
He married Harriet Rimington, daughter of James Rimington, on 10 October 1848, and succeeded to the title of 4th Baron Welles of Dungannon, co. Tyrone on 21 March 1858, as well as the title of 3rd Earl of Ranfurly, the title of 3rd Baron Ranfurly of Ramphorlie, co. Renfrew, and the title of 4th Viscount Northland of Dungannon, co. Tyrone.

Children of Thomas Knox, 3rd Earl of Ranfurly and Harriet Rimington (26 November 1824 – 16 March 1891)
Lady Agnes Henrietta Sarah Knox d. 29 Dec 1921
Thomas Granville Henry Stuart Knox, 4th Earl of Ranfurly b. 28 Jul 1849, d. 10 May 1875
Uchter John Mark Knox, 5th Earl of Ranfurly b. 14 Aug 1856, d. 1 Oct 1933

References

External links

1816 births
1858 deaths
UK MPs 1837–1841
UK MPs 1841–1847
UK MPs 1847–1852
UK MPs who inherited peerages
Alumni of St John's College, Cambridge
Members of the Parliament of the United Kingdom for County Tyrone constituencies (1801–1922)
Earls of Ranfurly